Breaking and Entering is a 1988 novel by American writer Joy Williams.

Publication
The novel was published a decade after Williams' second novel, The Changeling. This gap occurred in part because of a negative review Williams received from New York Times critic Anatole Broyard for her novel The Changeling.

Reception

Critical reception
The novel received positive reviews at the time of publication, and has continued to receive praise in the following decades.

American author Paul Lisicky has said he "fell in love" with the book while attending graduate school and that it influenced his own novel, Lawnboy.

Academic interpretation
Zoltán Abádi-Nagy, writing in the Hungarian Journal of English and American Studies, grouped the novel with works by other American "minimalist" authors. These include Jay McInerney's novel Bright Lights, Big City, and Bret Easton Elllis' novel Less than Zero.

References

1988 American novels
Novels set in Florida
Vintage Books books